Walter Butler Wilkinson (1781 – September 1807) was a political figure in Upper Canada.

He was born in 1781, the son of Richard Norton Wilkinson. He studied law, was called to the bar, and settled in Cornwall. In 1804, he was elected to represent Glengarry and Prescott in the 4th Parliament of Upper Canada. He died in 1807 while still in office.

References 
Becoming Prominent: Leadership in Upper Canada, 1791-1841, J.K. Johnson (1989)

1781 births
1807 deaths
Members of the Legislative Assembly of Upper Canada